Lavinia Bazhbeuk-Melikyan (April 3, 1922 – November 8, 2005) was a Soviet-Armenian painter who was a full member of the Russian Academy of Arts, and a People's Artist of the Armenian SSR.

Biography
Lavinia Bazhbeuk-Melikyan was born in 1922 in Tbilisi in the family of artist, graphic designer and sculptor Alexander Bazhbeuk-Melikyan. In 1935 she moved to Yerevan, studied at the Yerevan State College of Fine Arts named after Panos Terlemezyan. In 1951 she graduated from the Moscow State Academic Art Institute named after V.N. Surikov. In Pavel Korin’s studios she worked on the creation of the inlaid panels for Moscow “Komsomolskaya” metro station.

From 1962-1964 Lavinia had been a member of the board of administration for the Artists’ Artists Union, she was the delegate of the 2nd All-union congress of artists.

Since 1988 she was a corresponding member of the Art Academy of Russia, since 1997 – the Honored Art Worker of Russian Federation. Since 2002 – a full member of the Russian Academy of Arts.

Her works are kept in Modern Art Museum (Yerevan), National Gallery of Armenia (Yerevan), artistic funds of Armenia and Russia and in many private galleries and collections in different countries of the world.

Lavinia Bazhbeuk-Melikyan died on November 8, 2005.

Exhibitions

Since 1951 Lavinia was a constant participant of republican, all-union and international exhibitions.
 Painters house, Yerevan, 1979
 Moscow, 1980

Personal exhibitions
 1979 – Yerevan
 1980 – Moscow
 1989 – Luanda, Angola
 01.10.2008 -14.10.2008 Artists' Union of Armenia, Yerevan
 10.04.2007 - 06.05.2007 Russian Academy of Artists, Moscow

Awards
 1967 – Honored artist of Armenian
 1970 – she was awarded the Gold Medal of the USSR exhibition of economic achievements (VDNKH), Moscow
 1974 – for the portraits series was awarded the Diploma of the USSR Artists’ Union.
 1983 – People’s artist of the Armenian Soviet Socialist Republic
 1997 – Honored Artist of the Russian Federation

Works
 Father's-Alexander Bazhbeuk-Melikyan's portrait (1960)
 Mother (1961)
 Still life with books (1970)
 Self-portrait (1978)
 Painter Nina Zhilinskaya (1984)
 Aghabalyants sisters' portrait (1994)
 M. Khachatryan's portrait (1996)
 The Cactuses

References

External link

Yerevan State College of Fine Arts named after Panos Terlemezyan (official website, in Armenian)

1922 births
2005 deaths
Soviet artists
Armenian artists
20th-century Armenian painters
20th-century Armenian women artists
Painters from Georgia (country)
Artists from Tbilisi
Georgian people of Armenian descent